Ululu (also known as Hula Huli or Hulu Huli) is a tradition in Assam, Bengal, Odisha and Tamil Nadu, where during weddings and other festivals women produce a sound called 'Ululu'. It refers to festivity and prosperity.

Origin
This practice has origin in customs and rituals of ancient Middle-Easterners.

See also
 Ululation

References

Bengali culture
Marriage in Hinduism

4.Hula Huli Sound in odisha